Lars Holen (27 January 1912 – 23 August 1994) was a Norwegian politician for the Norwegian Labour Party.

He was elected to the Norwegian Parliament from Hedmark in 1965, and was re-elected on two occasions.

Holen was born in Alvdal and became a member of Alvdal municipality council in 1947, became deputy mayor during the term 1959–1963 and mayor from 1963–1966.

References

1912 births
1994 deaths
People from Alvdal
Labour Party (Norway) politicians
Members of the Storting
20th-century Norwegian politicians